Siah Bil (also Romanized as Sīāh Bīl) is a village in Khaleh Sara Rural District, Asalem District, Talesh County, Gilan Province, Iran. At the 2006 census, its population was 390, in 96 families.

References 

Populated places in Talesh County